Santi Giovanni Battista e Floriano is a Renaissance architecture Roman Catholic church and adjacent Franciscan convent are located on Piazza San Giovanni in the frazione of Isola di Fano  in Fossombrone, region of Marche, Italy.

History
In 1529, two brothers, Ludovico and Raffaele Tenaglia formed a Franciscan hermitage on the site. The church was erected in the 16th century, but has now become the Sanctuary of the Blessed Benedetto Passionei. The convent during its long history also housed a number of early Franciscan saints including San Giuseppe da Copertino and San Serafino da Montegranaro. The interior has a wooden altar with a canvas depicting a Madonna and Saints; this is a copy of an original by Federico Barocci, painted by Gaetano Bessi. The apse has a walnut choir stalls.

References

Churches in the Province of Pesaro and Urbino
Roman Catholic churches in the Marche
16th-century Roman Catholic church buildings in Italy